Sergeant First Class Layne Morris (born 1962) is a retired soldier in an American Special Forces unit.  Sergeant Morris was wounded and blinded in one eye during a fire-fight on July 27, 2002, that left Sergeant 1st Class Christopher J. Speer dead.

Canadian youth Omar Khadr, then fifteen and held from 2002 until 2012, by the United States, pled guilty for Speer's death. Mr Khadr's lawyers allege he was tortured into confessing.

Sergeant Morris retired from the military. He returned to his home in Utah, where he became a local West Valley City housing director in civilian life. He lives with his wife Leisl in South Jordan, Utah, a suburb of Salt Lake City. He appeared in a National Geographic special, U.S. Army Special Forces (2003), and on 60 Minutes (2007).

Civil suit
The United States alleged Khadr's father Achmed Said Khadr had been a close associate of Osama bin Laden and worked with members of Al-Qaeda; he was killed near the border of Afghanistan in 2004.  Sergeant Morris joined with Sergeant Speer's widow, Tabitha Speer, in a legal civil suit against Achmed Khadr's estate.  His argument, then, was that since Omar Khadr was only fifteen, he could not be held responsible for his actions—but his father could.

Normally "acts of war" are not subject to civil suits.  Morris and Speer argued successfully that Khadr was a terrorist, not a soldier—so his actions were not exempted from civil suits.

On February 16, 2006, U.S. District Judge Paul Cassell awarded Morris and Tabitha Speer triple damages, totalling $102.6 million. An article published in the June 14, 2007 Salt Lake Tribune said that Morris and Tabitha Speer might collect funds via the U.S. Terrorism Risk Insurance Act. A Treasury Department official had acknowledged that Ahmed Khadr's assets had been frozen, but said it was up to Morris and Speer to locate them. Senator Orrin Hatch had been asked to intervene and was "very interested".

In January 2008, a U.S. Attorney claimed the US federal government to have "sovereign immunity" over the seized funds, asserting that it does not have to comply with a judgement in a civil suit.

Guantanamo military commissions

Omar Khadr was named as one of ten detainees who faced charges before special military commissions.  These commissions were not courts martial.

Guantanamo military commission chief prosecutor Colonel Morris Davis said, on January 10, 2006, that he planned to call Layne Morris as a witness against Khadr. Sergeant Morris was to testify that he knew he was injured by Khadr. On June 29, 2006, the US Supreme Court upheld an earlier ruling that the commissions were unconstitutional because they had not been authorized by Congress, and violated both the Uniform Code of Military Justice and the United States' obligations under the Geneva Conventions.

Sergeant Morris told interviewers he was disappointed that the military commissions had been overturned.
"It is justice delayed. I don't think that's a good thing ... I think those tribunals could have provided a trial viewed as fair by most of the world. In that sense, I think it is unfortunate,"
"I guess I don't agree with giving these people all of the legal rights that citizens have,"
"I think everyone on both sides of the political aisle just wants to see some sort of resolution to their status and I guess it's just going to take longer now to figure out how that process is going to work."

In 2008, a five-page statement from an American who shot Khadr said that the youth had not been the only occupant of the compound to have survived the American aerial bombardment. He said further that Khadr had been shot in the back; he was sitting upright with his back to the skirmish. This cast doubt on assertions that Khadr had thrown the grenade that killed Speer.

While journalists questioned whether Omar Khadr threw the grenade at US forces, in a telephone interview with Michelle Shephard of the Toronto Star. Morris insisted "That was a total shock to me. Everyone had told me from the get-go that there was only one guy in there." He thought there was evidence that "Omar was the grenade man."

"Instead of surrendering and calling it a day, he made the decision to wait until personnel got close enough that he could restart the battle, pop up and throw a hand grenade."
"I'm fine with this dragging on for another five years before there's a trial as long as they stay locked up."

Khadr settlement
Morris criticized the Canadian government after they paid $10.5M to Khadr, by calling it “outrageous” in a letter. He called for Canada Prime Minister Justin Trudeau to be charged with treason. He also accused Trudeau of being an Omar Khadr “supporter” and “groupie”. He stated “it was wrong” for the Canadian government to settle Khadr's lawsuit, as well as believing that Canada should have taken Khadr's lawsuits to court.

References

External links
a brief account of Layne Morris's civil suit.
U.S. woman sues dead Khadr dad for $10 million, CTV, August 6, 2004

 you-tube mirror

 mirror
 mirror

Living people
United States Army soldiers
1961 births